Lu Kuei-hua is a Taiwanese football manager and former player. Lu is the first female head coach of Chinese Taipei women's national football team and associate professor of Department of Physical Education of  National Taiwan College of Physical Education.

Education 
In 1994, Lu earned a master's degree from Kyoto University of Education.

Career 
In Taiwan, Lu has worked in the National Taiwan College of Physical Education and managed the school's women's football team.

In 1999, Lu was appointed assistant coach and, in 2003, became the first female head coach of the Chinese Taipei women's football team.

References 

Living people
Taiwanese women's footballers
Taiwanese football managers
Chinese Taipei women's national football team managers
Taiwanese educators
Female association football managers
Women's association footballers not categorized by position
Year of birth missing (living people)